Colin Paul Farrell (born 19 March 1956) is a former New Zealand rugby union player. A fullback, Farrell represented  at a provincial level. He played two test matches for the New Zealand national side, the All Blacks, in 1977 against the touring British Lions side.

References

1956 births
Living people
Rugby union players from Auckland
People educated at St Paul's College, Auckland
New Zealand international rugby union players
New Zealand rugby union players
Auckland rugby union players
Rugby union fullbacks